The following are the telephone codes in Rwanda.

Telephone numbering plan

The Rwanda Utilities Regulatory Agency introduced a new telephone numbering plan in February 2009.

To call within Rwanda, the following format is now used:
 250 5XX XXX Land-line Calls (formerly 5XX XXX)
 255 5XX XXX Land-line Calls (formerly 5XX) 
 783 XXX XXX Mobile Calls (formerly 03 XXX XXX)
 788 XXX XXX Mobile Calls (formerly 08 XXX XXX)
 75X XXX XXX Mobile Calls (CDMA)

List of allocations in Rwanda

The leading zero must be dialled from abroad.

References

How to Call Rwanda - accessed 17 May 2010.
Rwanda telephone numbering changes - accessed 17 May 2010.

Rwanda
Telecommunications in Rwanda
Telephone numbers